Helen Vela (October 31, 1946 – February 14, 1992) was a Filipina actress and radio/TV personality.

Early life
She was born on October 31, 1946, in Manila, Philippines.

Career
Vela started her career in broadcasting as a radio announcer. She appeared on GMA Network (later BBC) show, Lovingly Yours, Helen. Followed by RPN shows are Heredero and Agila.  She was also a presenter at GMA Balita, GMA's first early evening Filipino newscast.

Personal life

In 1967, Vela married broadcaster Orly Punzalan (1935–2005), with whom she had two children: Pastor Paolo Punzalan, senior pastor of Victory Fort Bonifacio, and Princess Punzalan, born Bernadette Vela Punzalan, a nurse and former actress. They separated five years later and divorced. In 1973, Vela remarried, to Ben Hernandez. They had a son, Reuben.

Death
She died of lymphoma on February 14, 1992 (Valentine's Day) at St. Mary's Hospital, Mayo Clinic in Rochester, Minnesota, United States at the age of 45.

She was buried at the Manila Memorial Park in Parañaque City. Alongside her lies her mother Virginia Vela, who died in 1995, and her first husband Orly Punzalan, who died in 2005.

Lifetime achievement award

In 2004, the Golden Screen Awards for Television instituted a "Helen Vela Lifetime Achievement Award" for outstanding contribution to the Philippine television industry.

Legacy and honors
She was posthumously inducted as a Star to the Eastwood City Walk of Fame Philippines in December 2011.

Filmography

Film

Television

References

External links
 

1946 births
1992 deaths
Actresses from Manila
Filipino television actresses
Filipino film actresses
Deaths from cancer in Minnesota
Deaths from colorectal cancer
20th-century Filipino actresses
Burials at the Manila Memorial Park – Sucat
GMA Network personalities
GMA Integrated News and Public Affairs people
Filipino television news anchors
Women television journalists